Kazumi Evans (born September 14, 1989) is a Canadian actress. She began her career as a contestant on the CBC's Triple Sensation. As a voice actress, she has voiced Saffi on Bob the Builder, Madeline on The Deep, and Skipper in the Barbie films. One of her biggest roles to date is Princess Iris of Ephedia, the lead character in the French animated show LoliRock which was released in English by Netflix in May 2016.

Career
Evans trained at the Central Pennsylvania Youth Ballet, the Richmond Academy of Dance, and the Goh Ballet before becoming known as a voice actress. In 2007, Evans appeared as a contestant on the first season of the reality television series Triple Sensation to win a scholarship to a theatrical training institution. She was among the twelve finalists to reach the Master Class stage, but she did not win.

Filmography

Live action

Animation

References

External links

1989 births
Living people
Actresses from Vancouver
Canadian actresses of Japanese descent
Canadian film actresses
Canadian television actresses
Canadian voice actresses
21st-century Canadian actresses